Nonstructural protein 4B (NS4B) is a viral protein found in the hepatitis C virus. It has mass of 27 kDa and probably involved in process of intracellular membrane structure formation to allow virus replication.

References

Viral nonstructural proteins
Hepatitis C virus